DeShaney v. Winnebago County, 489 U.S. 189 (1989), was a case decided by the Supreme Court of the United States on February 22, 1989. The court held that a state government agency's failure to prevent child abuse by a custodial parent does not violate the child's right to liberty for the purposes of the Fourteenth Amendment to the United States Constitution.

Background
In 1980, a divorce court in Wyoming gave custody of Joshua DeShaney, born in 1979, to his father Randy DeShaney, who moved to Neenah, Winnebago County, Wisconsin.  A police report of child abuse and a hospital visit in January 1983, prompted the county Department of Social Services (DSS) to obtain a court order to keep the boy in the hospital's custody. Three days later, "On the recommendation of a 'child protection team,' consisting of a pediatrician, a psychologist, a police detective, the county's lawyer, several DSS caseworkers, and various hospital personnel, the juvenile court dismissed the case and returned the boy to the custody of his father."  The DSS entered an agreement with the boy's father, and five times throughout 1983, a DSS social worker visited the DeShaney home and recorded suspicion of child abuse and that the father was not complying with the agreement's terms.  No action was taken; the DSS also took no action to remove the boy from his father's custody after a hospital reported child abuse suspicions to them in November 1983.  Visits in January and March, 1984, in which the worker was told Joshua was too ill to see her, also resulted in no action. Following the March 1984, visit, "Randy DeShaney beat 4-year-old Joshua so severely that he fell into a life-threatening coma. Emergency brain surgery revealed a series of hemorrhages caused by traumatic injuries to the head inflicted over a long period of time. Joshua suffered brain damage so severe that he was expected to spend the rest of his life confined to an institution for the profoundly mentally disabled. He died Monday, November 9, 2015 at the age of 36.  Randy DeShaney was subsequently tried and convicted of child abuse." DeShaney served less than two years in jail.

Case history
Joshua DeShaney's mother filed a lawsuit on his behalf against Winnebago County, the Winnebago County DSS, and DSS employees under 42 U.S.C. § 1983.  The lawsuit claimed that by failing to intervene and protect him from violence about which they knew or should have known, the agency violated Joshua's right to liberty without the due process guaranteed to him by the Fourteenth Amendment to the United States Constitution.

Ruling
The court ruled 6–3 to uphold the appeals court's grant of summary judgment.  The DSS's actions were found not to constitute a violation of Joshua DeShaney's due process rights.

Court opinion
The court opinion, by Chief Justice William Rehnquist, held that the due process clause protects against state action only, and as it was Randy DeShaney who abused Joshua, a state actor (the Winnebago County Department of Social Services) was not responsible.

Furthermore, they ruled that the DSS could not be found liable, as a matter of constitutional law, for failure to protect Joshua DeShaney from a private actor.  Although there exist conditions in which the state (or a subsidiary agency, like a county department of social services) is obligated to provide protection against private actors, and failure to do so is a violation of Fourteenth Amendment rights, the court reasoned,

Since Joshua DeShaney was not in the custody of the DSS, the DSS was not required to protect him from harm. In reaching this conclusion, the court opinion relied heavily on its precedents in Estelle v. Gamble and Youngberg v. Romeo.

Rehnquist's opinion stated that although the DSS's failure to act may have made it liable for a tort under Wisconsin state law, the Fourteenth Amendment does not transform every tort by a state actor into a violation of constitutional rights.  Specifically, the act of creating a Department of Social Services to investigate and respond to allegations of child abuse may have meant that Winnebago County assumed a duty to prevent what Randy DeShaney did to Joshua DeShaney, and failure to fulfil that duty may have constituted a tort.

Dissents
The court's ruling generated two dissents.  The first, by Associate Justice William Brennan, asserted that whether or not the Due Process Clause gave Joshua DeShaney a constitutional right to protection against abuse was a non-sequitur, since it was not an argument presented to either of the lower courts or even to the Supreme Court and "no one, in short, has asked the Court  to proclaim that, as a general matter, the Constitution safeguards positive as well as negative liberties."  He went on to say that Rehnquist used a flawed interpretation of the Estelle and Youngberg precedents, which Brennan held "to stand for the much more generous proposition that, if a State cuts off private sources of aid and then refuses aid itself, it cannot wash its hands of the harm that results from its inaction."  Finally, Brennan argued that the Wisconsin child-protection laws created a regime in which private citizens and government bodies other than a Department of Social Services had no power or role to intervene with child abuse other than notifying the DSS.  As such, Brennan held that the child-protection laws constituted the same custodial "deprivation of liberty" that Rehnquist's opinion held necessary for a Due Process violation.

A second, shorter but more famous dissent was written by Associate Justice Harry Blackmun, who had (along with Associate Justice Thurgood Marshall) joined Brennan's dissent.  In the first of his opinion's four paragraphs, Blackmun reiterated Brennan's contention that there had been state action in establishing a DSS that promised to provide protection against child abuse and absolved all other state and non-state actors of the responsibility or authority to act.  He went on to compare the Court's ruling to the Dred Scott case, saying that in both cases the court upheld an injustice by choosing a restrictive interpretation of the Constitution and then denying that choice.

Poor Joshua lament
Blackmun's dissent is famous due to its fourth paragraph which is as follows:

Poor Joshua! Victim of repeated attacks by an irresponsible, bullying, cowardly, and intemperate father, and abandoned by respondents who placed him in a dangerous predicament and who knew or learned what was going on, and yet did essentially nothing except, as the Court revealingly observes, ante, at 193, "dutifully recorded these incidents in [their] files." It is a sad commentary upon American life, and constitutional principles – so full of late of patriotic fervor and proud proclamations about "liberty and justice for all" – that this child, Joshua DeShaney, now is assigned to live out the remainder of his life profoundly retarded. Joshua and his mother, as petitioners here, deserve – but now are denied by this Court – the opportunity to have the facts of their case considered in the light of the constitutional protection that 42 U.S.C. 1983 is meant to provide.

President Bill Clinton quoted the "Poor Joshua!" paragraph in his remarks on Blackmun's retirement, and the DeShaney v. Winnebago dissent was, along with his authorship of the Roe v. Wade decision and the first part of his Flood v. Kuhn majority opinion, the most widely referenced element of Blackmun's career in obituaries following his death. It was also quoted as the headline for Time magazine's article on the decision.

Subsequent attention to ruling
Cornell law professor Michael C. Dorf has written that "DeShaney was a legitimately difficult case about the point at which state indifference to private action that the Constitution does not regulate becomes unconstitutional 'state action.'"

In the lead-up, in June 2010, to confirmation hearings for Solicitor General Elena Kagan's appointment to the Supreme Court by President Barack Obama, Linda Greenhouse in The New York Times summarized:
Two decades later, the DeShaney decision remains a subject of contention. It has prompted a large literature, including at least one book (The DeShaney Case: Child Abuse, Family Rights and the Dilemma of State Intervention, by Lynne Curry) and many law review articles. Lower courts have cited it hundreds of times. The Supreme Court is regularly asked to revisit the issue and regularly declines, without comment, to do so.
The case had entered the confirmation process because Kagan was a law clerk to Justice Marshall when the appeal first arrived at the Court and wrote a memo to Marshall cautioning against taking the case (a) without a signal of wider support on the Court (the "Join 3" response: an agreement conditioned on another three justices first agreeing; Kagan called it the "Join 4" and was corrected by the Justice) and (b) because the Court was likely to rule, as it ultimately did, against the extension of the due process protection to find for the plaintiff in the case.

See also
 Town of Castle Rock v. Gonzales
 List of United States Supreme Court cases, volume 489
 List of United States Supreme Court cases
 Lists of United States Supreme Court cases by volume
 List of United States Supreme Court cases by the Rehnquist Court

References

External links
 

United States children's rights case law
United States substantive due process case law
United States Supreme Court cases
United States Supreme Court cases of the Rehnquist Court
1989 in United States case law
Winnebago County, Wisconsin
Child abuse case law